Alberto Albero (born 4 February 1952) is a former Italian long jumper who was 6th at the 1976 European Indoor Championships.

Career
Shortly after doing the minimum to participate in the 1976 Montreal Olympic Games he had to retire athletics due to tendon problems at the age of 24, at his full potential.

National records
 Long jump indoor: 7.84 m ( Milan, 10 February 1976) - record holder until 10 March 1982.

Achievements

National titles
Albero won three national championships at individual senior level.
Italian Athletics Indoor Championships
Long jump: 1972, 1975, 1976 (3)

References

External links
 Alberto Albero at TheSports.org

1952 births
Living people
Italian male long jumpers
Sportspeople from Pisa
Athletics competitors of Centro Sportivo Carabinieri